The British Journal of General Practice is a monthly peer-reviewed medical journal for general practitioners and primary care researchers.

History 
The journal was established in 1953 as the College of General Practitioners' Research Newsletter. It was renamed Journal of the College of General Practitioners in 1960 (from 1967 Journal of the Royal College of General Practitioners), before obtaining its current name in 1990. Since 2013, the journal's digital content is hosted by HighWire Press.

Research articles are published as open access. The journal publishes editorials on clinical and policy topics, debate and analysis, clinical guidance, and a section called "Life & Times" which contains reviews of art, books, and film as well as viewpoints, polemic, and entertainment. In the course of its history, the journal has had nine editors: Roger Jones was the editor-in-chief until April 2020 and the current editor is Euan Lawson. The editorial office and the journal team are located at the Royal College of General Practitioners.

Abstracting and indexing 
The journal is abstracted and indexed in:
 Index Medicus/MEDLINE/PubMed
 Science Citation Index
 Current Contents/Clinical Medicine
 Scopus
According to the Journal Citation Reports, it has a 2021 impact factor of 6.302.

References

External links 
 

Monthly journals
English-language journals
General medical journals
Academic journals published by learned and professional societies of the United Kingdom
Publications established in 1953